Cambiac is a village and commune in the Haute-Garonne department in southwestern France. It is best known for the castle which dominates the village.

Geography
The commune is bordered by four other communes: Caraman to the northwest, Auriac-sur-Vendinelle to the northeast, Maurens to the southeast, and finally by Beauville to the southwest.

Population

Sights
Originally a 15th-century castle, the privately-owned castle Château de Cambiac has been much altered and is listed as a historic site by the French Ministry of Culture in 2001.

See also
Communes of the Haute-Garonne department

References

Communes of Haute-Garonne